Les Grandes Baigneuses, or The Large Bathers, is a painting by Pierre-Auguste Renoir made between 1884 and 1887. The painting is in the Philadelphia Museum of Art, in Philadelphia.

The painting depicts a scene of nude women bathing. In the foreground, two women are seated beside the water, and a third is standing in the water near them. In the background, two others are bathing. The one standing in the water in the foreground appears to be about to splash one of the women seated on the shore with water. That woman leans back to avoid the expected splash of water. 

The figures have a sculptural quality, while the landscape behind them shimmers with impressionistic light. With this new style, Renoir's intention was to reconcile the modern forms of painting with the painting traditions of the 17th and 18th centuries, particularly those of Ingres and Raphael. Renoir also admired Rubens and Titian's works, and he tried to find a compromise between the styles of these old masters and the new impressionist style.

Painting
It is inspired at least in part by a sculpture by François Girardon, The Bath of the Nymphs (1672), a low lead relief realized for a fountain park of Versailles. It also reflects the influence of the works of Ingres, and particularly the frescoes of Raphael, whose style he had absorbed during his trip to Italy. These two great artists influenced Renoir's entire way of painting and drawing: he began to paint in a more disciplined and more conventional manner, gave up painting outdoors, and made the female nude – until then only an occasional subject– his main focus.

Renoir worked on The Bathers for three years until he was content with its composition. During that time, he made numerous studies and sketches, including at least two full-sized figure drawings of the theme.

The Bathers may also be regarded as Renoir's pictorial testament. The models for the three bathers included two of his favorites: Aline Charigot, the blonde sitting behind, whom Renoir married in 1890, and Suzanne Valadon, herself a painter and the mother of Maurice Utrillo. 

After completing The Large Bathers, Renoir received severe criticism because of his new style. Tired and disillusioned, he never again created paintings of this caliber. A similar subject later appeared in a series of paintings by Paul Cézanne.

References

Paintings by Pierre-Auguste Renoir
1880s paintings
Paintings in the collection of the Philadelphia Museum of Art
Nude art
Bathing in art